The women's 3000 metres event at the 2000 World Junior Championships in Athletics was held in Santiago, Chile, at Estadio Nacional Julio Martínez Prádanos on 22 October.

Medalists

Results

Final
22 October

Participation
According to an unofficial count, 19 athletes from 15 countries participated in the event.

References

3000 metres
Long distance running at the World Athletics U20 Championships